Kiwi most commonly refers to: 
 Kiwi (bird), a flightless bird native to New Zealand
 Kiwi (nickname), an informal name for New Zealanders
 Kiwifruit, an edible berry
 Kiwi dollar or New Zealand dollar, a unit of currency

Kiwi or KIWI may also refer to:

Music
 Kiwi (band), a girl group from Mongolia
 "Kiwi" (song), a 2017 song by Harry Styles
 "Kiwi", a 2007 song by Maroon 5 from It Won't Be Soon Before Long

Radio
 KIWI, a radio station in California, U.S.
 Kiwi FM, a New Zealand radio network

Ships
 HMNZS Kiwi (T102), a minesweeper commissioned in 1941
 HMNZS Kiwi (P3554), a patrol boat commissioned in 1983

Sports
 Kiwi (horse) (1977–1995), a thoroughbred racehorse
 Kiwis (rugby league), the New Zealand national rugby league team
 Kiwi FC or Vailima Kiwi FC, a Samoan football club 
 Kiwi Soccers, an American Samoan football club

Travel
 Kiwi.com, a Czech online travel agency
 Kiwi International Air Lines, an American airline 1992–1999
 Kiwi Regional Airlines, a New Zealand airline 2015–2016
 Kiwi Travel International Airlines, a 1990s New Zealand airline
 Wiscasset Airport's ICAO code KIWI

Technology 

 Kiwi IRC, a popular IRC software client
 .kiwi, an Internet top-level domain
 KIWI (openSUSE), image software
 KIWI, a testbed prototype of the nuclear thermal rocket
 Kiwi Farms, an Internet forum

Other uses
 Kiwi!, a 2006 short animated film
 Kiwi (business) or Kiwi Campus, a food delivery service using robots
 Kiwi (shoe polish), an Australian brand name
 Kiwi (store), a Scandinavian supermarket chain
 Kiwi River, a river in New Zealand's South Island
 Kiwi, a fictional character in Code Lyoko
 Kiwi, a fictional character in Cyberpunk: Edgerunners
 Kiwi, a fictional character in Chowder

People with the given name
 Kiwi Camara (born 1984), Filipino American attorney
 Kiwi Gardner (born 1993), American basketball player
 Kiwi Kingston (fl. 1964/65), New Zealand wrestler and film actor
 Kiwi Searancke (born c. 1952), New Zealand rugby player

See also
Bulford Kiwi, a chalk hill carving in Wiltshire, England
HMNZS Kiwi, a list of ships
Kiwikiwi (Blechnum fluviatile), a fern species
Kivi (disambiguation)
Kivy (disambiguation)